Eupatorium is a genus of flowering plants in the family Asteraceae, containing from 36 to 60 species depending on the classification system. A few are shrubs. The genus is native to temperate regions of the Northern Hemisphere. Most are commonly called bonesets, thoroughworts or snakeroots in North America. The genus is named for Mithridates Eupator, king of Pontus.

Systematics and taxonomy
Eupatorium has at times been held to contain as many as 800 species, but many of these have been moved (at least by some authors) to other genera, including Ageratina, Chromolaena,
Condylidium, Conoclinium, Critonia, Cronquistianthus, Eutrochium, Fleischmannia, Flyriella, Hebeclinium, Koanophyllon, Mikania, and Tamaulipa.

The classification of the tribe Eupatorieae, including species placed in Eupatorium in the present or past, is an area of ongoing research, so further changes are likely. What seems fairly certain by now is that there is a monophyletic group containing Eupatorium (about 42 species of white flowered plants in North America, Europe and Asia, but not South America) and the Joe-pye weeds (Eutrochium), and possibly others.

Uses
Eupatorium are grown as ornamental plants, particularly in Asia. A number of popular ornamental plants formerly included in Eupatorium have been moved to other genera, such as Bartlettina and Conoclinium.

Tobacco leaf curl virus is a pathogen occasionally affecting plants of this genus. The foliage is eaten by some Lepidoptera larvae, including those of Orthonama obstipata (The Gem).

Medical use
The common names for the plants are all based on the previous usage of one species, Eupatorium perfoliatum, as an herbal medicine.  Despite its name, boneset is not used to treat broken bones, instead the common name apparently derives from the herb's use to treat dengue fever, which was also called breakbone fever because of the pain that it caused. The name thoroughwort also comes from Eupatorium perfoliatum, and refers to the perfoliate leaves, in which the stem appears to pierce the leaf (i.e. go through, note that in older usage "thorough" was not distinguished from "through", compare for example the word thoroughfare).

Boneset, although poisonous to humans and grazing livestock, has been used in folk medicine, for instance to excrete excess uric acid which causes gout.
Caution is advised when using boneset, since it contains toxic compounds that can cause liver damage. Side effects include muscular tremors, weakness, and constipation; overdoses may be deadly.

Selected species

North America
 Eupatorium album L.– white thoroughwort
 Eupatorium altissimum  L. – tall thoroughwort
Eupatorium anomalum Nash – Florida thoroughwort apomictic hybrid derivative of Eupatorium mohrii and Eupatorium rotundifolium
 Eupatorium capillifolium (Lamarck) Small – dog-fennel
 Eupatorium compositifolium Walter – Yankeeweed
 Eupatorium godfreyanum Cronquist, apomictic hybrid derivative of Eupatorium rotundifolium and Eupatorium sessilifolium
 Eupatorium hyssopifolium L. – hyssop-leaved thoroughwort
 Eupatorium lancifolium (Torrey & A.Gray) Small – lance-leaved thoroughwort
 Eupatorium leptophyllum DC. – false fennel
 Eupatorium leucolepis (DC.) Torrey & A.Gray – justiceweed
 Eupatorium linearifolium Walter – (Eupatorium cuneifolium)
 Eupatorium maritimum E.E.Schill. – apomictic hybrid derivative of Eupatorium mohrii and Eupatorium serotinum
 Eupatorium mikanioides Chapman – semaphore thoroughwort
 Eupatorium mohrii Greene – Mohr's thoroughwort
Eupatorium novae-angliae  (Fernald) V.I.Sullivan ex A.Haines & Sorrie  apomictic hybrid derivative of Eupatorium paludicola and Eupatorium perfoliatum
 Eupatorium paludicola E.E.Schill. & LeBlond – swamp thoroughwort, until 2007 classified as part of Eupatorium leucolepis
 Eupatorium perfoliatum L. – common boneset
 Eupatorium petaloideum Britton – showy white thoroughwort, often considered to be part of Eupatorium album
 Eupatorium pilosum Walter – rough boneset, often considered to be part of Eupatorium rotundifolium
 Eupatorium resinosum  Torrey ex DC. – pine barren boneset
 Eupatorium rotundifolium L. – round-leaved thoroughwort
 Eupatorium semiserratum  DC. – smallflower thoroughwort
 Eupatorium serotinum L. – late boneset, late thoroughwort
 Eupatorium sessilifolium L. – upland boneset
 Eupatorium sullivaniae E.E.Schill. – apomictic hybrid derivative of Eupatorium album and Eupatorium lancifolium

Europe
 Eupatorium cannabinum L. – hemp-agrimony

Asia

 Eupatorium amabile Kitam.
 Eupatorium benguetense C.Robinson
 Eupatorium camiguinense Merr.
 Eupatorium chinense L.
 Eupatorium formosanum Hayata
 Eupatorium fortunei Turcz. – fujibakama, pei lan
 Eupatorium japonicum Thunb. (often included in E. chinense)
 Eupatorium lindleyanum DC.
 Eupatorium luchuense Nakai
 Eupatorium makinoi T.Kawahara & T.Yahara (see E. chinense)
 Eupatorium nodiflorum DC.
 Eupatorium quaternum DC.
 Eupatorium sambucifolium Elmer
 Eupatorium shimadai Kitam.
 Eupatorium squamosum D.Don
 Eupatorium tashiroi Hayata
 Eupatorium toppingianum Elmer
 Eupatorium variabile Makino
 Eupatorium yakushimaense Masam. & Kitam

Moved to other genera 
 Eupatorium adamantium Gardner (moved to Koanophyllon)
 Eupatorium amygdalinum (moved to Ayapana)
 Eupatorium ayapana – aya-pana, water hemp (moved to Ayapana triplinervis)
 Eupatorium bracteatum Gardn. (moved to Stomatanthes, S. pernambucensis) 
 Eupatorium coelestinum – mistflower (moved to Conoclinium)
 Eupatorium collinum (moved to Chromolaena collina)
 Eupatorium itatiayense Hieron. (moved to Symphyopappus)
 Eupatorium gayanum (moved to Aristeguietia gayana)
 Eupatorium laevigatum DC. (moved to Chromolaena)
 Eupatorium ligustrinum (moved to Ageratina ligustrina)
 Eupatorium maculatum (moved to Eutrochium maculatum) Joe-Pye weed
 Eupatorium maximiliani Schrad. ex DC. (moved to Chromolaena)
 Eupatorium megalophyllum (moved to Bartlettina sordida)
 Eupatorium officinale (moved to Mikania)
 Eupatorium pacificum (moved to Ageratina)
 Eupatorium purpureum (moved to Eutrochium purpureum)
 Eupatorium pyrifolium DC. (moved to Steyermarkina)
 Eupatorium rufescens P.W.Lund. ex DC. (moved to Kaunia)
 Eupatorium rugosum (moved to Ageratina altissima)
 Eupatorium sordidum (moved to Bartlettina sordida)
 Eupatorium squalidum DC. (moved to Chromolaena)
 Eupatorium urticaefolium (moved to Ageratina, synonym of A. altissima)
 Eupatorium vauthierianum DC. (moved to Heterocondylus alatus)

References

Bibliography 
  (2004): Encyclopedia of Folk Medicine: Old World and New World Traditions. ABC-CLIO, Inc., Santa Barbara. 
 
  (1995): Taxonomy of Eupatorium Section Verticillata (Asteraceae). New York Botanical Garden Press. 
  (2005): The Gale Encyclopedia of Alternative Medicine (2nd ed., vol. 1). Gale Group, New York. 
 PDF
 
 

 
 

 
Medicinal plants
Asteraceae genera
Taxa named by Carl Linnaeus
Dioecious plants